Eik Tse "Sherman" Kwek (born 1975/76) is a Singaporean businessman, and the CEO of City Developments Limited since January 2018.

Sherman Kwek earned a bachelor's degree in business administration from Boston University.

In August 2017, Kwek, then deputy CEO, became CEO-designate after the then CEO Grant Kelley resigned after three and a half years in the role, and left at the end of 2017.

In January 2018, he became the CEO of City Developments Limited.

References

Singaporean chief executives
Singaporean people of Hokkien descent
Living people
1970s births
Boston University School of Management alumni